Libya's 2007 census has over 15,010 workers from Sri Lanka and some other Buddhist countries (about 12,000 Koreans and more than 2,000 citizens from China) which made up about 0.3% of total population of Libya. This makes Libya the country with the one of highest proportions of Buddhists in North Africa despite there not being any Buddhist pagodas or temples.

Theravada Buddhists make up two thirds and are primarily Sinhalese while the remaining third follow East Asian Buddhism and are Korean or Chinese nationals.

History
Hegesias of Cyrene was a philosopher of the Cyrenaic school around 290 BC.
It has been thought by some that Hegesias was influenced by Greco-Buddhism.

Notes

References 
 Country Profile of Libya (Religious Intelligence) 
 Religious Freedom Profile of Libya 
 The US State Department's International Religious Freedom Report 2006 - Libya

Libya
Religion in Libya
Libya
Sinhalese people